Das Riesenrad (English: The Giant Wheel) is a 1961 West German drama film directed by Géza von Radványi. It was entered into the 2nd Moscow International Film Festival. It was shot at the Spandau Studios and on location in Vienna and West Berlin. The sets were designed by the art directors Johannes Ott and Willy Schatz.

Cast
 Maria Schell as Elisabeth von Hill
 O. W. Fischer as Rudolf von Hill
 Adrienne Gessner as Adele von Hill
 Rudolf Forster as Hofrat von Hill
 Doris Kirchner as Gusti Gräfin Wallburg
 Gregor von Rezzori as Graf Wallburg
 Gusti Wolf as Gisela von Hill
 Alexander Trojan as Walter von Hill
 Anita Gutwell as Rita

References

External links
 

1961 films
West German films
1960s German-language films
German black-and-white films
Films directed by Géza von Radványi
Films set in Vienna
Films set in the 1910s
Films set in the 1920s
Films set in the 1930s
Films set in the 1940s
Films set in the 1950s
German films based on plays
Gloria Film films
1960s historical drama films
German historical drama films
Films shot at Spandau Studios
1961 drama films
1960s German films